Pinosava (Serbian Cyrillic: Пиносава) is a small town and a suburb of Belgrade, Serbia. It is located in Belgrade's municipality of Voždovac, on the western slope of the Avala mountain, in the valley of the Topčiderka river, over 15 kilometers south of downtown Belgrade. It is located in the Low Šumadija, and the neighboring plateau is named after the town (Pinosava plateau).

History 

On 14 August 1932, the gliding school was opened in Pinosava, due to its position on the slopes of the Avala mountain. On the same day, Mrs. Srškić christened the first Yugoslav glider, naming it Orlić ("eaglet"). On 1 October 1933, additional hangar was added to the complex, and named "Živko Jozanov" after the student and gliding pioneer who was killed in accident.

Population 

Pinosava is statistically classified as an urban settlement (town). The population has been fluctuating in the last several decades. Population of Pinosava according to the official censuses of population.

 1971: 2,631
 1981: 2,837
 1991: 2,645
 2002: 2,839
 2011: 3,151

Ethnic structure: according to the census of 2002, the Serbs make 2,781 or 98% of the population.

Characteristics 

In September 2019 it was announced that a large sports complex will be built in Pinosava. The complex will also include restaurants, shops, warehouses and sports objects. Areas for basketball, volleyball, tennis, handball, indoor and outdoor swimming pools, sports hall and aqua park will cover  in total. The complex is planned in the southern part of the village, next to the Avala Road and the projected Avala-Ripanj Interchange.

References 

Suburbs of Belgrade
Šumadija